Jimmy Hall (born April 26, 1949) is the American lead singer and harmonica player for the Southern rock group, Wet Willie.

Hall was born in Birmingham, Alabama, and reared in Mobile, Alabama. He first gained notoriety in 1970 as the lead vocalist, saxophonist and harmonica player for Wet Willie. The band’s R&B-infused rock and roll style propelled its biggest hit, “Keep On Smilin’,” into the Top 10 on the Billboard singles chart in 1974.

Wet Willie released five albums with Capricorn Records before moving to the Epic label in 1977, where its singles “Street Corner Serenade” and “Weekend” charted in the Top 40.

In 1980, Hall scored a solo hit with the single "I'm Happy that Love Has Found You" (US No. 27, AC #30). In May 1982, Hall peaked at No. 77 with the song "Fool for Your Love."

From 1982 to 1984, he was, one of two frontmen of the group Betts, Hall, Leavell and Trucks.

In 1985, he sang lead vocals on Jeff Beck's album Flash and was nominated for a Grammy Award for the performance. Hall has also toured with Hank Williams Jr., playing saxophone and harmonica.

Discography
 Touch You (Epic, 1980) U.S. No. 183
 Cadillac Tracks (Epic, 1982)
 Flash (Jeff Beck album), 1985
 Rendezvous with Blues (Capricorn, 1996)
 Triple Trouble (Telarc, 2003) with Tommy Castro, Lloyd Jones, Tommy Shannon, Chris Layton
 All Night All Stars (Capitol, 2003)
 The Mighty Jeremiahs (Ear X-tacy, 2005), with Greg Martin, Mark Hendricks, Jon McGee
 Build Your Own Fire (Zoho Music, 2007)
 Shoals Rhythm Collective (Music Avenue, 2007)
 Jeff Beck Live At The Hollywood Bowl (Eagle Vision 2017)
 Ready Now'' (Keeping The Blues Alive, 2022)

References

External links
Official Website

1949 births
American Southern Rock musicians
Living people
Musicians from Birmingham, Alabama
Musicians from Mobile, Alabama
Zoho Music artists